Baral  (Urdu) is a village on the bank of the Jhelum River, near Pandori in the district of Jhelum in the north of Punjab province, Pakistan. Baral Village is sharing boundary with Mangla Cantonment (also refers as Baral Cantt). It is about 28 km away from Jhelum and 12 km from Dina City.

References

Villages in Jhelum District